is a city in Toyama Prefecture, Japan. , the city had an estimated population of 48,659 in 16,739 households  and a population density of 384 persons per km².

Geography

Tonami is located in the Tonami plains of western Toyama Prefecture. Much of the area is a dispersed settlement typical of this region of Japan.

Surrounding municipalities
Toyama Prefecture
 Toyama
 Takaoka
 Oyabe
 Nanto
 Imizu

Climate
Tonami has a humid continental climate (Köppen Cfa) characterized by mild summers and cold winters with heavy snowfall. The average annual temperature in Himi is 13.8 °C. The average annual rainfall is 2414 mm with September as the wettest month. The temperatures are highest on average in August, at around 26.4 °C, and lowest in January, at around 2.4 °C.

Demographics
Per Japanese census data, the population of Tonami has recently plateaued after a long period of growth.

History
The area of present-day Tonami was part of ancient Etchū Province, and was part of the holdings of Kaga Domain under the Edo period Tokugawa shogunate. The town of Tonami was founded on April 1, 1952 by the merger of the town of Demachi with the villages of Gokaya, Aburaden, Shoge, Nakamura and Hayashi. The villages of Aoshima and Ogami joined two months later on June 1, 1952. The villages of Ota, Minamihannya, Higachi-Nojiri, Yanaze and Nishi-Tonami were annexed on January 15, 1954, followed by Sendan, Sendanyama, Hannya, and Higashi-Hannya on March 1. The expanded town of Tonami was raised to city status on April 1, 1954. On November 1, 2004, the town of Shōgawa (from Higashitonami District) was merged into Tonami.

Government
Tonami has a mayor-council form of government with a directly elected mayor and a unicameral city legislature of 18 members.

Education
Tonami has eight public elementary schools and four public junior high schools operated by the town government, and two public high schools operated by the Toyama Prefectural Board of Education.

Transportation

Railway
West Japan Railway Company (JR West) - Jōhana Line
  -  -

Highway
Hokuriku Expressway

International relations
  - Lisse, Netherlands, sister city since April 21, 1992
 – Panjin, Liaoning, China, friendship city since April 25, 1991
 – Yalova, Turkey, friendship city since October 3, 1989

Local attractions
Masuyama Castle, ruins of a Sengoku period castle and National Historic Site. It was also known as 
Yotaka festival, held in June, with many parade floats which purposely collide during the festival, drawing large crowds to witness the spectacle. The Yotaka festival event originally began in the neighboring town of Fukuno. It features competitions between groups carrying mikoshi portable shrines. "Yoiyasa" is a traditional saying shouted by many during the event. When it is night, lamps using paper shades are lit. This festival is a prayer for a good harvest of the fields.

Tulips
There is a tulip park in Tonami, as well as a nationally recognized tulip festival that is held every year. There is a windmill transferred by the Netherlands, inscribed "DE VRIENDSCHAP" (friendship). The Tonami tulip festival has over 600 different kinds of tulips, and more than 2.5 million tulips in recent years.

References

External links

  

 
Cities in Toyama Prefecture